Where's Dick? is an opera in two acts composed by Stewart Wallace. The work uses an English language libretto by Michael Korie. The opera is satire on 1980s American life and tabloid journalism and follows the experiences of Junior ("an all-American boy") who in reaction to the crime and corruption he sees around him searches for the detective hero Dick Tracy.

It was first performed in a workshop format by Opera Omaha on 26 September 1987. The production was led by conductor Jeff Halpern and starred Consuela Hill as Chief Blowhard, Lauren Flanigan as Mrs. Heimilich, and Henry Stram as Junior.

The opera's first full-scale production and official premiere, with largely the same cast, was given at the Miller Outdoor Theater in Houston and was produced for Houston Grand Opera on 24 May 1989 by its touring arm, Texas Opera Theater. HGO music director John DeMain conducted a run of eight performances.

Where's Dick was the first of Wallace's operas to be given a fully staged performance and the first collaboration between Wallace and his librettist, Michael Corrie. They went on to create several more operas, including Kabbalah (1989), Harvey Milk (1995), and Hopper's Wife (1997).

References
Notes

Sources

Griffel, Margaret Ross and Fried, Adrienne (1999). "Where's Dick", in Operas in English: A Dictionary, p. 650. Greenwood Press.
Swed, Mark (15 January 1995). "A Life Custom-Made for Opera" Los Angeles Times. Retrieved 23 September 2012.
Ward, Charles (26 May 1989). "Where's Dick? loses track of its purpose". Houston Chronicle. Retrieved 21 September 2012.

Further reading
Allbright, William (26 May 1989). "Houston's Campy, Pop Where's Dick?". Los Angeles Times. Retrieved 21 September 2012.
Heymont, George (3 July 1989). "The chase is on", Out Week, No. 2, pp. 53 and 76. Retrieved 21 September 2012.
Holland, Bernard (4 June 1989). "Seeking A Phantom Dick Tracy", New York Times. Retrieved 21 September 2012.
Rosenberg, Donald (7 June 1990). "'Kabbalah' explores mystical side of Judaism". The Pittsburgh Press. Retrieved 21 September 2012.
Ward, Charles (21 May 1989). "Comic-strip swipe at American culture: Where's Dick? employs popular music, novel storytelling techniques". Houston Chronicle. Retrieved 21 September 2012.

External links
Where's Dick? at www.stewartwallace.com (audio samples and production photos)
Where's Dick? at Schott Music (roles list and instrumentation)
Heymont, George (21 September 2010). "Two Operas You'll Never See Performed at the Met!". Huffington Post

1987 operas
English-language operas
Operas
Operas by Stewart Wallace
Operas set in the United States
Operas set in the 20th century